Rosalind is a feminine given name derived from Old German word elements that meant horse and soft, tender. The name also has a folk etymology meaning of pretty rose. Notable people with the name include:

Rosalind Ashford (born 1943), American singer, member of Martha and the Vandellas
Rosalind Blauer (1943–1973), Canadian economist
Rosalind Brett, writer of romance novels
Rosalind Cash (1938–1995), American singer and actress
Rosalind Chao (born 1957), American actress born in Anaheim, California
Rosalind Creasy (born 1939), American landscape designer and author
Rosalind Franklin (1920–1958), British physical chemist and crystallographer who made very important contributions to the understanding of the fine structures of coal and graphite, DNA and viruses
Rosalind Hackett, American historian
Rosalind Halstead (born 1984), British actress
Rosalind Hamilton, Duchess of Abercorn (1869–1958), British aristocrat
Rosalind Heywood (1895–1980), British psychical researcher
Rosalind Hicks (1919–2005), British literary guardian and only child of Agatha Christie
Rosalind Hursthouse (born 1943), philosopher whose theories are centred to the abortion debate
Rosalind Knight (1933–2020), English actress
Rosalind Newman (born 1946), American choreographer
Rosalind Peychaud (born 1948), New Orleans civic activist
Rosalind Ridley (born 1949), British neuropsychologist
Rosalind Rowe (1933–2015), English table tennis player
Rosalind Russell (1907–1976), American actress

English feminine given names
Given names derived from plants or flowers

Notes